Ananta (infinite) literally means "unending" and has additional meanings in the context of Indic religions.

Anant/Ananta may also refer to:

Hinduism
Ananta Shesha, the serpent that circles the world

Places
Ananta (Arequipa), a mountain in the Arequipa Region, Peru
Ananta (Cusco), a mountain in the Cusco Region, Peru
Ananta (Puno), a mountain in the Puno Region, Peru
Anantapur, Andhra Pradesh, a district of Andhra Pradesh, India
Ananta Vasudeva Temple (thirteenth century) at Bhubaneswar, in Orissa state of India
Thiruvananthapuram (holy city of Anantha), capital city of Kerala

Companies 

 Ananta Group, a manufacturer of ready made garments in Bangladesh

People

People in government
Ananta (king) (died 1068 AD), a king of the Lohara dynasty of Kashmir
Ananta Narcina Naik, Indian politician
Ananta Nayak (born 1969), Indian politician
Ananta Prasad Paudel (born 1962), Nepalese politician
Ananta Singh (1903–1979), Indian revolutionary

People in film
Anant Balani (1962-2003), Bollywood film director and screenwriter
Ananta Jalil, film actor, producer of Bangladesh
Ananth Babu, Indian Telugu film actor
Ananta Sriram (born 1984), Indian lyricist working primarily in Telugu film

People in literature
Ananta Charan Sukla (1942-2020), Indian philosopher and writer
Ananta Kandali (1540–1580), Brahmin poet

Other people
Ananta Charan Sai Babu (1915–1989), Indian dancer
Ananta Kumar Ghosh (born 1954), Indian football coach
Ananta Mandal (born 1983), Indian artist
Fahd Ananta (born 1988), Bangladeshi entrepreneur
Ananth Dodabalapur, Indian-American engineer

See also
Ananda (disambiguation)
Anta (disambiguation)